Son of a Witch (2005) is a fantasy novel by American writer Gregory Maguire. The book is Maguire’s fifth revisionist story and the second set in the land of Oz originally conceived by L. Frank Baum. Son of a Witch continues the story after the fall from power of the Wizard of Oz and the death of Elphaba by recounting the life of Elphaba’s son, Liir. The book is dedicated to the cast of the Broadway musical version of Wicked.

Background
Like Wicked, Son of a Witch elaborates a darker and more mature side of the world of Oz. In an interview that was included with the Son of a Witch audio CD, Gregory Maguire gave two reasons for writing the book: "the many letters from young fans asking what happened to Nor, last seen as a chained political prisoner, and seeing the Abu Ghraib torture photographs."

Plot
Oatsie Manglehand discovers the body of a young man, badly bruised and near death, by the side of a road in the Vinkus and brings him to the Cloister of Saint Glinda. The Superior Maunt recognizes the young man as Liir, the young boy who left the Cloister with Elphaba a decade or so ago. The Maunt appoints Candle, a young Quadling girl, to watch over Liir. While he recovers, Liir tells Candle the following story:

After Elphaba's death, Liir accompanied Dorothy Gale and her friends back to the Emerald City. The others went off to receive what they were promised by the Wizard, leaving Liir alone. Liir spent some time unsuccessfully searching for Nor, Fiyero's daughter who went missing during the events of Wicked. After living on the streets of the Emerald City for a time, Liir enlisted in the Home Guard. During his service, he was deployed on a peacekeeping mission to Quadling Country. After being forced to participate in the destruction of a Quadling village, Liir deserted the Home Guard and returned to the castle of Kiamo Ko. Later, the Quadlings attacked and killed most of the soldiers and dragons were then sent to punish them.

One day, the Princess of the Swans landed at Kiamo Ko, having been attacked by a predator. Before she died, she asked Chistery the flying monkey to take her place at the Conference of the Birds. Chistery declined and Liir decided to go in her stead. While flying on Elphaba's broom to reach the Conference, Liir was attacked by dragons, who took the broom. Liir fell to earth, where Oatsie Manglehand found him. 

After Candle hears Liir's story, the two run away together and settle in a deserted farmhouse, which Candle names "Apple Press Farm." Liir goes to the Conference of the Birds, where he learns that the Birds are under attack. The new Emperor of Oz is afraid of the Birds' power to spread news throughout the land and has sent the dragons to attack them. Liir agrees to help the Conference destroy the dragons and recover the broom.

Returning to Apple Press Farm, Candle tells Liir she is pregnant, explaining that she had sex with him while he was unconscious. Liir meets with his old military friend Trism bon Cavalish, who he discovers is responsible for training the dragons to perform their killing missions. Liir convinces Trism to help him kill the dragons by poisoning their food. They recover Elphaba's broom and cloak and flee the City.

During their flight, Liir and Trism become lovers. They end up at the Cloister of Saint Glinda, where the Home Guard besiege them. The mauntery is spared from attack because Glinda is staying there on retreat. With her help, they come up with a plan for the pair's escape: Liir will fly away on his broom, while Trism will leave with Glinda, disguised as her servant. Liir flies about Oz, collecting and training a huge flock of Birds, which he leads to the Emerald City. Over the City, they fly in formation as a huge representation of the Witch.

When returning home, it dawns on Liir that the "ELPHABA LIVES!" graffiti he has seen in the Emerald City is in Nor's handwriting. When he arrives at Apple Press Farm, Candle is gone, but he finds wrapped in Elphaba's cloak a newborn baby who he initially thinks is dead but revives under his care. Holding the baby up to the rain to wash away the birth blood, she "cleans up green."

In a subplot, Liir meets the Scrow people and their leader Princess Nastoya, an Elephant who took human form in order to hide from the Wizard. Now dying, Nastoya asks for Liir's help in finding a way to change back.

Major Characters

Liir: The protagonist of the story and the son of Elphaba and Fiyero. Liir is described as handsome, tall with black hair and pale skin. He is fourteen at the start of the novel, which spans a period of over ten years. The story also reveals that Liir may be bisexual, having romantic relationships with both Trism and Candle.

Candle: A Quadling girl who rarely speaks, and only in her native tongue, Qua'ati (though she understands other speech). She is a skilled player on the domingon, a Quadling musical instrument and has a "talent for reading the present." 

Princess Nastoya: The leader of the Scrow, a Vinkus tribe. An Elephant who disguised herself in human form. She asks Liir to find a way to return her to human form before she dies.

Trism bon Cavalish: an old military friend of Liir's and later, his lover. Trism has great skill at training dragons, although he is distressed at the tasks for which he trains them.

Commander Cherrystone: Liir's commanding officer in the Home Guard. He becomes Liir's mentor, which leads to Liir being put in charge of the operation to burn the Quadling village of Bengda.

Oatsie Manglehand: A woman who runs a horse-and-coach caravan that transports passengers along the Grassland Trail through the Vinkus. She finds the injured Liir and brings him to the Cloister of Saint Glinda.

The Superior Maunt of the Cloister of Saint Glinda: The Superior Maunt during Elphaba's seven-year stay at the Cloister. During the siege of the Cloister, she abdicates as sole authority of the mauntery and establishes a triumvirate consisting of herself, Sister Doctor, and the absent Candle.

Yackle: An old maunt who admits Candle into the Cloister and warns Liir of impending danger.

Chistery: The snow monkey Elphaba taught to speak and gave wings (making him a Winged monkey). He remains at Kiamo Ko, looking after Nanny.

Shell Thropp/The Emperor Apostle: Elphaba's half brother, Shell is a fop and gigolo (and perhaps a sex addict). He becomes Emperor of Oz after the assassination of the Scarecrow.
 
Lady Glinda Chuffrey, née Arduenna of the Uplands: Glinda is appointed interim ruler of Oz after the overthrow of the Wizard, but abdicates in favor of the Scarecrow. When her husband Lord Chuffrey dies, Glinda goes on retreat at the Cloister of Saint Glinda.

The Scarecrow: This character has a more substantial role in Son of a Witch than the Tin Man or the Cowardly Lion. He searches out Liir after having seen the Wizard to warn him that the slum he is living in is about to be 'cleaned up' by the authorities, and brings Elphaba's broom to Liir.

Rain: Liir and Candle's daughter.

Release details

Son of a Witch was first released on October 1, 2005 in hardcover format by Regan Books. The paperback edition was released in the United States on January 1, 2006.

Literary significance and criticism
Overall, reviews for Son of a Witch were mixed. Some reviewers praised the book for its innovative look into an imperfect fantasy world while others disparaged the book's alleged lack of focus.  Writing for The Boston Globe, Sarah Smith wrote, "Maguire has done it again: Son of a Witch is as wicked as they come," but Katharine Powers for The Washington Post called it "off-kilter and aimless." Kirkus Reviews keeps the middle ground of these two characterizations, writing, "The book works too hard to dazzle us; it's considerably more cluttered and strained than Wicked…but few readers will fail to stay its magical course. Once again, the myth of Oz proves its enduring power."

In 2011, Gay-Nerds.com named Liir #1 on its list of Top Ten LGBT Book Characters.

Notes

2005 American novels
2005 fantasy novels
American fantasy novels
Novels by Gregory Maguire
Oz (franchise) books
Sequel novels
The Wicked Years
Novels based on fairy tales
ReganBooks books